This article lists described species of the family Asilidae start with letter M.

A
B
C
D
E
F
G
H
I
J
K
L
M
N
O
P
Q
R
S
T
U
V
W
Y
Z

List of Species

Genus Macahyba
 Macahyba nordestina (Carrera, 1947)

Genus Machimus
 Machimus achterbergi (Tomasovic, 2004)
 Machimus acutus (Martin, 1975)
 Machimus adustus (Martin, 1975)
 Machimus agilis (Wiedemann, 1828)
 Machimus alatavicus (Lehr, 1967)
 Machimus alterus (Williston, 1901)
 Machimus angularis (Ricardo, 1922)
 Machimus aradensis (Theodor, 1980)
 Machimus araxanus (Richter, 1963)
 Machimus aridus (Lehr, 1999)
 Machimus armeniacus (Richter, 1963)
 Machimus armipes (Becker, 1913)
 Machimus arthriticus (Zeller, 1840)
 Machimus asiaticus (Becker, 1925)
 Machimus asiaticus (Lehr, 1999)
 Machimus assamensis (Ricardo, 1919)
 Machimus aurimystax (Bromley, 1928)
 Machimus aurulentus (Becker, 1925)
 Machimus autumnalis (Banks, 1914)
 Machimus ayubiensis (Rahim, 1976)
 Machimus bataviensis (Meijere, 1914)
 Machimus bengalensis (Joseph & Parui, 1986)
 Machimus bicolor (Joseph & Parui, 1984)
 Machimus biljici (Adamovic, 1959)
 Machimus blascoi (Weinberg & Bächli, 2001)
 Machimus brevis (Martin, 1975)
 Machimus bromleyanus (Carrera & Andretta, 1950)
 Machimus calicutensis (Joseph & Parui, 1986)
 Machimus cancerae (Martin, 1975)
 Machimus caudiculatus (Speiser, 1910)
 Machimus cavagnaroi (Joseph & Parui, 1995)
 Machimus cerasinus (Martin, 1975)
 Machimus chaldaeus (Janssens, 1961)
 Machimus cheriani (Joseph & Parui, 1986)
 Machimus chinensis (Ricardo, 1919)
 Machimus cinchonaensis (Joseph & Parui, 1986)
 Machimus cinerarius (Pallas, 1818)
 Machimus coerulescens (Ricardo, 1919)
 Machimus coleus (Martin, 1975)
 Machimus coruscus (Wulp, 1898)
 Machimus cowini (Hobby, 1946)
 Machimus cyanopus (Loew, 1849)
 Machimus debilis (Becker, 1923)
 Machimus decipiens (Theodor, 1980)
 Machimus divinosus (Oldroyd, 1972)
 Machimus divisus (Becker, 1923)
 Machimus dravidicus (Joseph & Parui, 1986)
 Machimus dubiosus (Becker, 1923)
 Machimus dubius (Ricardo, 1919)
 Machimus elegans (Loew, 1849)
 Machimus erevanensis (Richter, 1963)
 Machimus ermineus (Becker, 1907)
 Machimus floridensis (Bromley, 1940)
 Machimus funebris (Theodor, 1980)
 Machimus gertschi (Bromley, 1951)
 Machimus gonatistes (Zeller, 1840)
 Machimus grantae (Martin, 1975)
 Machimus gratiosus (Loew, 1871)
 Machimus griseus (Hine, 1906)
 Machimus guttatus (Martin, 1975)
 Machimus gymnus (Oldroyd, 1939)
 Machimus hierosolymae (Theodor, 1980)
 Machimus hirsutus (Ricardo, 1922)
 Machimus hirtipes (Ricardo, 1919)
 Machimus ibizensis (Gil & Collado, 1932)
 Machimus impeditus (Becker, 1925)
 Machimus incisuralis (Bromley, 1935)
 Machimus indianus (Ricardo, 1919)
 Machimus indicus (Joseph & Parui, 1986)
 Machimus infrafemoralis (Bromley, 1935)
 Machimus intricans (Becker, 1923)
 Machimus inutilis (Bromley, 1935)
 Machimus javieri (Weinberg & Bächli, 2001)
 Machimus juxta (Oldroyd, 1939)
 Machimus keniaensis (Lindner, 1961)
 Machimus keralaensis (Joseph & Parui, 1986)
 Machimus khasiensis (Ricardo, 1919)
 Machimus krueperi (Becker, 1923)
 Machimus laevis (Becker, 1923)
 Machimus largus (Richter, 1963)
 Machimus latipex (Martin, 1975)
 Machimus lepturus (Gerstaecker, 1871)
 Machimus leucocephalus (Janssens, 1968)
 Machimus linearis (Becker, 1923)
 Machimus longipenis (Martin, 1975)
 Machimus longipennis (Lehr, 1999)
 Machimus lucentinus (Strobl, 1909)
 Machimus macophthalmus (Loew, 1871)
 Machimus madeirensis (Schiner, 1868)
 Machimus margaretae (Weinberg & Tsacas, 1975)
 Machimus martini (Tomasovic, 2003)
 Machimus mcalpinei (Martin, 1975)
 Machimus meridionalis (Efflatoun, 1934)
 Machimus modestus (Loew, 1849)
 Machimus mondali (Joseph & Parui, 1995)
 Machimus montanus (Ricardo, 1919)
 Machimus monticola (Frey, 1940)
 Machimus mussooriensis (Joseph & Parui, 1986)
 Machimus mystacinus (Becker, 1923)
 Machimus nahalalensis (Theodor, 1980)
 Machimus negevensis (Theodor, 1980)
 Machimus nevadensis (Strobl, 1909)
 Machimus nicobarensis (Schiner, 1868)
 Machimus nigrinus (Ricardo, 1919)
 Machimus nigripes (Ricardo, 1922)
 Machimus nigrosetosus (Séguy, 1941)
 Machimus nilgiriensis (Parui & Joseph, 1994)
 Machimus niveibarbus (Bellardi, 1861)
 Machimus notialis (Martin, 1975)
 Machimus oriens (Martin, 1975)
 Machimus painteri (Martin, 1975)
 Machimus pammelas (Speiser, 1910)
 Machimus parvus (Ricardo, 1919)
 Machimus perniciosus (Becker, 1923)
 Machimus perplexus (Becker, 1915)
 Machimus polyphemi (Bullington & Beck, 1991)
 Machimus portosanctanus (Cockerell, 1921)
 Machimus pseudogonatistes (Villeneuve, 1930)
 Machimus pseudonicobarensis (Joseph & Parui, 1987)
 Machimus punjabensis (Bromley, 1935)
 Machimus pyrenaicus (Becker, 1923)
 Machimus ricardoi (Bromley, 1935)
 Machimus rudis (Becker, 1923)
 Machimus rufipes (Ricardo, 1922)
 Machimus sagittarius (Villeneuve, 1930)
 Machimus sanctimontis (Janssens, 1960)
 Machimus sareptanus (Becker, 1923)
 Machimus scarbroughi (Joseph & Parui, 1986)
 Machimus schuezi (Lindner, 1961)
 Machimus sestertius (Martin, 1975)
 Machimus setiventris (Engel, 1930)
 Machimus smithi (Joseph & Parui, 1986)
 Machimus soikai (Janssens, 1961)
 Machimus stanfordae (Martin, 1975)
 Machimus subgenitalis (Bromley, 1935)
 Machimus submaculus (Martin, 1975)
 Machimus tenebrosus (Williston, 1901)
 Machimus tephraeus (Wiedemann, 1820)
 Machimus thoracius (Loew, 1849)
 Machimus tibialis (Ricardo, 1919)
 Machimus truncatus (Oldroyd, 1972)
 Machimus tugajorum (Lehr, 1964)
 Machimus ugandiensis (Ricardo, 1919)
 Machimus ventralis (Martin, 1975)
 Machimus virginicus (Banks, 1920)

Genus Machiremisca
 Machiremisca costalis (Theodor, 1980)
 Machiremisca verticillatus (Becker, 1907)

Genus Macrocolus
 Macrocolus barrettoi (Carrera, 1949)
 Macrocolus bicolor (Engel, 1930)
 Macrocolus martinorum (Artigas & Papavero, 1988)
 Macrocolus rubripes (Carrera & Papavero, 1962)

Genus Macroetra
 Macroetra angola (Londt, 1994)
 Macroetra cera (Londt, 1994)
 Macroetra damara (Londt, 1994)

Genus Mactea
 Mactea avocettina (Richter & Mamaev, 1976)
 Mactea chinensis (Hradský & Geller-Grimm, 2003)
 Mactea matsumurai (Hradský & Geller-Grimm, 2003)

Genus Maira
 Maira abscissa (Walker, 1860)
 Maira albifacies (Wulp, 1872)
 Maira appendiculata (Bezzi, 1928)
 Maira aterrima (Harmann, 1914)
 Maira aurifacies (Macquart, 1848)
 Maira bicolor (Joseph & Parui, 1987)
 Maira calopogon (Bigot, 1878)
 Maira cambodgiensis (Bigot, 1878)
 Maira claripennis (Le Gouillou, 1842)
 Maira compta (Walker, 1861)
 Maira conveniens (Walker, 1861)
 Maira definadoi (Joseph & Parui, 1981)
 Maira elegans (Walker, 1855)
 Maira elysiaca (Osten-Sacken, 1881)
 Maira flagellata (Walker, 1861)
 Maira germana (Walker, 1858)
 Maira gracilicornis (Meijere, 1913)
 Maira hirta (Meijere, 1913)
 Maira hispidella (Wulp, 1872)
 Maira indiana (Joseph & Parui, 1987)
 Maira kollari (Doleschall, 1857)
 Maira lauta (Wulp, 1885)
 Maira leei (Paramonov, 1958)
 Maira limbidorsum (Bezzi, 1928)
 Maira longicornis (Meijere, 1913)
 Maira longirostrata (Bromley, 1935)
 Maira nigrithorax (Wulp, 1872)
 Maira niveifacies (Macquart, 1850)
 Maira nychthemera (Wulp, 1872)
 Maira occulta (Wulp, 1872)
 Maira paradisiaca (Walker, 1859)
 Maira paria (Bigot, 1878)
 Maira pseudoindiana (Joseph & Parui, 1995)
 Maira setipes (Walker, 1861)
 Maira smaragdina (Bigot, 1878)
 Maira superba (Meijere, 1913)
 Maira tincta (Meijere, 1913)
 Maira tomentosa (Wulp, 1872)
 Maira tuberculata (Wulp, 1872)
 Maira vanderwulpi (Meijere, 1913)
 Maira varians (Ricardo, 1929)
 Maira villipes (Doleschall, 1857)
 Maira whitneyi (Curran, 1936)
 Maira willistoni (Curran, 1936)
 Maira wollastoni (Austen, 1915)
 Maira xizangensis (Shi, 1995)

Genus Mallophora
 Mallophora annuliventris (Artigas & Angulo, 1980)
 Mallophora antiqua (Walker, 1855)
 Mallophora ardens (Macquart, 1934)
 Mallophora argentipes (Macquart, 1838)
 Mallophora bassleri (Curran, 1941)
 Mallophora candens (Walker, 1851)
 Mallophora cingulata (Artigas & Angulo, 1980)
 Mallophora circumflava (Artigas & Angulo, 1980)
 Mallophora clavipes (Curran, 1941)
 Mallophora cortesi (Artigas & Angulo, 1980)
 Mallophora crocuscopa (Artigas & Angulo, 1980)
 Mallophora dureti (Artigas & Angulo, 1980)
 Mallophora emiliae (Carrera, 1960)
 Mallophora fritzi (Artigas & Angulo, 1980)
 Mallophora gracipes (Artigas & Angulo, 1980)
 Mallophora hemivitrea (Artigas & Angulo, 1980)
 Mallophora inca (Curran, 1941)
 Mallophora incanipes (Artigas & Angulo, 1980)
 Mallophora leucopyga (Artigas & Angulo, 1980)
 Mallophora lugubris (Lynch & Arribálzaga, 1880)
 Mallophora media (Clements, 1969)
 Mallophora papaveroi (Artigas & Angulo, 1980)
 Mallophora parasylveirii (Artigas & Angulo, 1980)
 Mallophora pusilla (Macquart, 1838)
Mallophora ruficauda (Weidemann, 1828)
 Mallophora scopipeda (Rondani, 1863)
 Mallophora scopitarsis (Rondani, 1863)
 Mallophora singularis (Macquart, 1838)
 Mallophora tertiavitrea (Artigas & Angulo, 1980)
 Mallophora thompsoni (Artigas & Angulo, 1980)
 Mallophora tsacasi (Artigas & Angulo, 1980)
 Mallophora wilhelmi (Artigas & Angulo, 1980)

Genus Mauropteron
 Mauropteron farinum (Daniels, 1987)
 Mauropteron pelago (Walker, 1849)

Genus Megalometopon
 Megalometopon immisericorde (Artigas, 1970)

Genus Megaphorus
 Megaphorus brunneus (Cole, 1964)
 Megaphorus durangoensis (Cole, 1964)
 Megaphorus flavidus (Cole, 1964)
 Megaphorus frustrus (Pritchard, 1935)
 Megaphorus lascruensis (Cole, 1964)
 Megaphorus martinorum (Cole, 1964)
 Megaphorus minutus (Macquart, 1834)
 Megaphorus prudens (Pritchard, 1935)
 Megaphorus willistoni (Cole, 1964)

Genus Meliponomima
 Meliponomima martensis (Artigas & Papavero, 1989)

Genus Melouromyia
 Melouromyia diaphorus (Londt, 2002)

Genus Mercuriana
 Mercuriana stackelbergi (Lehr, 1988)

Genus Merodontina
 Merodontina abligueodentia Shi, 1992
 Merodontina bellicosa Scarbrough & Constantino, 2005
 Merodontina indiana Joseph & Parui, 1984
 Merodontina insula Scarbrough & Hill, 2000
 Merodontina jianfenglingensis Hua, 1987
 Merodontina nigripes Shi, 1991
 Merodontina obliquata Shi, 1991
 Merodontina rectidensa Shi, 1991
 Merodontina robusta Rao & Parui, 1994
 Merodontina rufirostra Shi, 1991
 Merodontina sikkimensis Enderlein, 1914
 Merodontina silvatica Haupt & Azuma, 1998
 Merodontina spinulosa Joseph & Parui, 1997
 Merodontina thaiensis Scarbrough & Hill, 2000

Genus Mesoleptogaster
 Mesoleptogaster bicoloripes (Hsia, 1949)
 Mesoleptogaster convergens (Frey, 1937)
 Mesoleptogaster eoa (Lehr, 1961)
 Mesoleptogaster fulvicrus (Hsia, 1949)
 Mesoleptogaster fuscatipennis (Frey, 1937)
 Mesoleptogaster gracilipes (Hsia, 1949)
 Mesoleptogaster levusara (Evenhuis, 2006)
 Mesoleptogaster loaloa (Evenhuis, 2006)
 Mesoleptogaster meriel (Evenhuis, 2006)
 Mesoleptogaster trimaculata (Meijere, 1914)
 Mesoleptogaster vitiensis (Evenhuis, 2006)

Genus Metadioctria
 Metadioctria resplendens (Loew, 1872)

Genus Metalaphria
 Metalaphria australis (Ricardo, 1912)

Genus Metapogon
 Metapogon albulus (Melander, 1924)
 Metapogon amargosae (Wilcox, 1972)
 Metapogon carinatus (Wilcox, 1964)
 Metapogon gilvipes (Coquillett, 1904)
 Metapogon holbrooki (Wilcox, 1964)
 Metapogon hurdi (Wilcox, 1964)
 Metapogon leechi (Wilcox, 1964)
 Metapogon obispae (Wilcox, 1972)
 Metapogon punctipennis (Coquillett, 1904)
 Metapogon tarsalus (Wilcox, 1964)
 Metapogon tricellus (Wilcox, 1964)

Genus Michotamia

 Michotamia analis Macquart, 1838
 Michotamia annulata Bigot, 1878
 Michotamia assamensis Joseph & Parui, 1995
 Michotamia aurata (Fabricius, 1794)
 Michotamia coarctata (Macquart, 1855)
 Michotamia compedita (Wiedemann, 1828)
 Michotamia cothurnata (Bigot, 1875)
 Michotamia decepta Scarbrough & Hill, 2000
 Michotamia demeijerei Oldroyd, 1975
 Michotamia fuscifemorata Joseph & Parui, 1984
 Michotamia indiana Joseph & Parui, 1981
 Michotamia latifascia (Walker, 1857)
 Michotamia macquarti Joseph & Parui, 1984
 Michotamia minor (Meijere, 1911)
 Michotamia nigra (Meijere, 1911)
 Michotamia nigra Scarbrough & Hill, 2000 (Homonym)
 Michotamia praeacuta (Wulp, 1898)
 Michotamia pruthii Joseph & Parui, 1987
 Michotamia scitula (Walker, 1859)
 Michotamia setitarsata Schiner, 1867
 Michotamia siamensis Tomosovic & Grootaert, 2003
 Michotamia singaporensis Tomosovic & Grootaert, 2008
 Michotamia triangulum (Wulp, 1872)
 Michotamia vulpina (Bigot, 1875)

Genus Microphontes
 Microphontes megoura (Londt, 1994)
 Microphontes safra (Londt, 1994)
 Microphontes whittingtoni (Londt, 1994)

Genus Microstylum
 Microstylum albimystaceum (Macquart, 1855)
 Microstylum amoyense (Bigot, 1878)
 Microstylum ananthakrishnani (Joseph & Parui, 1985)
 Microstylum apicale (Wiedemann, 1821)
 Microstylum apiforme (Walker, 1851)
 Microstylum appendiculatum (Macquart, 1847)
 Microstylum atrorubens (Timon-David, 1952)
 Microstylum balbillus (Walker, 1849)
 Microstylum barbarossa (Wiedemann, 1828)
 Microstylum basalis (Brunetti, 1928)
 Microstylum basirufum (Bigot, 1878)
 Microstylum bhattacharyai (Joseph & Parui, 1985)
 Microstylum bicolor (Macquart, 1849)
 Microstylum biggsi (Oldroyd, 1960)
 Microstylum bloesum (Walker, 1849)
 Microstylum braunsi (Engel, 1932)
 Microstylum brevipennatum (Bigot, 1878)
 Microstylum bromleyi (Timon-David, 1952)
 Microstylum capucinum (Bigot, 1879)
 Microstylum catastygnum (Papavero, 1971)
 Microstylum cilipes (Macquart, 1838)
 Microstylum cinctum (Bromley, 1931)
 Microstylum coimbatorensis (Joseph & Parui, 1987)
 Microstylum decretus (Walker, 1860)
 Microstylum difficile (Wiedemann, 1828)
 Microstylum dimorphum (Matsumura, 1916)
 Microstylum dispar (Loew, 1858)
 Microstylum elongatum (Bigot, 1879)
 Microstylum erythropygum (Bigot, 1878)
 Microstylum eximium (Bigot, 1878)
 Microstylum fafner (Enderlein, 1914)
 Microstylum fenestratum (Wiedemann, 1828)
 Microstylum flavipenne (Macquart, 1846)
 Microstylum flaviventre (Macquart, 1850)
 Microstylum fulvicaudatum (Bigot, 1879)
 Microstylum fulvigaster (Bigot, 1878)
 Microstylum fulviventre (Wulp, 1898)
 Microstylum galactodes (Loew, 1866)
 Microstylum gigas (Wiedemann, 1821)
 Microstylum gladiator (Bromley, 1927)
 Microstylum griseum (Bromley, 1927)
 Microstylum haemorrhoidale (Bigot, 1878)
 Microstylum helenae (Bezzi, 1914)
 Microstylum hirtipes (Ricardo, 1925)
 Microstylum hobbyi (Bromley, 1947)
 Microstylum imbutum (Walker, 1851)
 Microstylum incomptum (Walker, 1857)
 Microstylum indutum (Rondani, 1875)
 Microstylum insigne (Bromley, 1927)
 Microstylum lambertoni (Bromley, 1931)
 Microstylum leucacanthum (Bezzi, 1908)
 Microstylum libo (Walker, 1849)
 Microstylum lucifer (Bromley, 1930)
 Microstylum luciferoides (Bromley, 1942)
 Microstylum maculiventris (Bezzi, 1908)
 Microstylum magnum (Bromley, 1927)
 Microstylum marudamamaiensis (Joseph & Parui, 1987)
 Microstylum melanomystax (Enderlein, 1914)
 Microstylum miles (Karsch, 1879)
 Microstylum mydas (Engel, 1932)
 Microstylum nigrescens (Ricardo, 1900)
 Microstylum nigribarbatum (Bigot, 1879)
 Microstylum nigricauda (Wiedemann, 1824)
 Microstylum nigrimystaceum (Ricardo, 1925)
 Microstylum nigrisetosum (Efflatoun, 1937)
 Microstylum nigritarse (Bromley, 1927)
 Microstylum nigrostriatum (Hobby, 1933)
 Microstylum nigrum (Bigot, 1859)
 Microstylum nitidiventre (Bigot, 1878)
 Microstylum oberthuerii (Wulp, 1896)
 Microstylum otacilius (Walker, 1849)
 Microstylum partitum (Walker, 1856)
 Microstylum pauliani (Timon-David, 1952)
 Microstylum pedunculata (Bezzi, 1908)
 Microstylum pollex (Oldroyd, 1970)
 Microstylum polygnotus (Walker, 1849)
 Microstylum proclive (Walker, 1860)
 Microstylum proximum (Oldroyd, 1960)
 Microstylum pseudoananthakrishnani (Joseph & Parui, 1989)
 Microstylum rabodae (Karsch, 1884)
 Microstylum remicorne (Loew, 1863)
 Microstylum rhypae (Walker, 1849)
 Microstylum ricardoae (Oldroyd, 1970)
 Microstylum rubigenis (Bromley, 1927)
 Microstylum rubripes (Macquart, 1838)
 Microstylum rufinale (Macquart, 1850)
 Microstylum rufinevrum (Macquart, 1855)
 Microstylum rufoabdominalis (Brunetti, 1928)
 Microstylum rufum (Ricardo, 1925)
 Microstylum sagitta (Bigot, 1879)
 Microstylum saverrio (Walker, 1849)
 Microstylum scython (Walker, 1849)
 Microstylum seguyi (Timon-David, 1952)
 Microstylum sessile (Bezzi, 1908)
 Microstylum simplicissimum (Loew, 1852)
 Microstylum sordidum (Walker, 1854)
 Microstylum spectrum (Wiedemann, 1828)
 Microstylum spinipes (Ricardo, 1925)
 Microstylum spurinum (Walker, 1849)
 Microstylum strigatum (Enderlein, 1914)
 Microstylum sumatranum (Enderlein, 1914)
 Microstylum sura (Walker, 1849)
 Microstylum taeniatum (Wiedemann, 1828)
 Microstylum tananarivense (Bromley, 1931)
 Microstylum testaceum (Macquart, 1846)
 Microstylum trimelas (Walker, 1851)
 Microstylum umbrosum (Bromley, 1931)
 Microstylum unicolor (Ricardo, 1925)
 Microstylum ustulatum (Engel & Cuthbertson, 1938)
 Microstylum validum (Loew, 1858)
 Microstylum varipennatum (Bigot, 1879)
 Microstylum varshneyi (Joseph & Parui, 1985)
 Microstylum venosum (Wiedemann, 1821)
 Microstylum vestitum (Rondani, 1875)
 Microstylum villosum (Bigot, 1879)
 Microstylum vulcan (Bromley, 1928)
 Microstylum whitei (Brunetti, 1928)

Genus Millenarius
 Millenarius graminosus (Londt, 2005)

Genus Minicatus
 Minicatus mirabilis (Lehr, 1967)

Genus Molobratia
 Molobratia arkadii (Lehr, 2002)
 Molobratia bokhai (Lehr, 2002)
 Molobratia chujoi (Nagatomi & Imaizumi, 1989)
 Molobratia kanoi (Hradský, 1980)
 Molobratia nipponi (Hradský, 1980)
 Molobratia pekinensis (Bigot, 1878)
 Molobratia sapporensis (Matsumura, 1916)
 Molobratia triangulata (Haupt & Azuma, 1998)
 Molobratia youngi (Geller-Grimm, 2005)

Genus Myaptexaria
 Myaptexaria acutus (Artigas, 1980)
 Myaptexaria vexillaria (Artigas, 1970)
 Myaptexaria virilis (Artigas, 1970)

Genus Myelaphus
 Myelaphus dispar (Loew, 1873)
 Myelaphus jozanus (Matsumura, 1916)

References 

 
Asilidae